Events in the year 1856 in Japan.

Incumbents
Monarch: Kōmei

Events
January 28 - The port of Shimoda is opened per Japan's first treaty of amity with Russia. (Traditional Japanese Date: Twenty-first Day of the Twelfth Month, 1855)

References

 
1850s in Japan
Japan
Years of the 19th century in Japan